HMS Valorous was one of two 16-gun, steam-powered   second-class paddle frigates built for the Royal Navy in the 1850s. Commissioned in 1853 she played a small role in the Crimean War of 1854–1855 and was sold for scrap in 1891.

Design and construction
Their crew numbered 175 officers and ratings.

The ships were fitted with a pair of 2-cylinder oscillating steam engines, rated at 400 nominal horsepower, that drove their paddlewheels. The ships were armed with eight 32-pounder (56 cwt) cannon on the gundeck.

Valorous was built at a cost of £69,064, of which her machinery cost £24,329. She was originally ordered on 25 April 1847 as a first-class sloop to John Edye's design, approved on 12 August 1847. On 5 August they were re-ordered as  vessels.  When finished, they constituted the last group of paddle warships built for the Royal Navy.

Career
In 1852 she was in the Mediterranean Sea, then in 1854 she was assigned to the Baltic Sea. On 23 July, Valorous ran aground off Åland, Grand Duchy of Finland. She was severely damaged, losing her forefoot and keel and being holed. A sail was placed over the hole and her crew managed to prevent her from sinking. In 1855 she operated in the Black Sea during the Crimean War. In 1857 she was on the North America and West Indies Station, and from 1863 until she was paid off in September 1867 she operated off the Cape of Good Hope. On 10 January 1871, she was driven from her moorings and ran aground at Plymouth, Devon. Damage was described as slight. She was refloated and found to be leaky. She was taken in to Holstenborg for repairs, which took ten days. A watertight bulkhead was inserted at the bow as part of the repairs. In 1878 she was commanded by Captain John A Fisher (later Admiral of the Fleet).

Disposal
She was sold on 27 February 1891 to E Marshall of Plymouth for breaking up.

Notes

Citations

References

External links
 History of HMS Valorous

1851 ships
Frigates of the Royal Navy
Victorian-era frigates of the United Kingdom
Ships built in Pembroke Dock
Crimean War naval ships of the United Kingdom
Maritime incidents in July 1854
Maritime incidents in January 1871
Maritime incidents in July 1875